Folabi Olumide (1936 – 8 January 2021 ) was a Nigerian academic and medical surgeon best known for being the first Vice-Chancellor of Lagos State University, a position he held from 1983–1988.

Olumide died from COVID-19 in 2020.

Bibliography

References

1939 births
2021 deaths
Academic staff of Lagos State University
Nigerian surgeons
Vice-Chancellors of Lagos State University
Deaths from the COVID-19 pandemic in Nigeria